Back-construction may refer to the (somewhat related) terms:
 Back-formation
 Backronym